Kiakola Rural District is a rural district (dehestan) in the Central District of Simorgh County, Mazandaran Province, Iran. At the 2006 census, its population was 4,217, in 1,114 families. The rural district has 9 villages.

References 

Rural Districts of Mazandaran Province
Simorgh County